Ignacio "Nacho" Ithurralde Sáez (born 30 May 1983 in Durazno) is a Uruguayan football manager and former player who played as a centre back. He is the current manager of Montevideo City Torque.

Playing career

Club
Ithurralde began his playing career in 2002 with Defensor Sporting where he spent 5 years. He played in Mexico with CF Monterrey in 2007 and then in Argentina with Olimpo and Rosario Central.

In 2009, Ithurralde returned to Uruguay to play for Peñarol, and moved to Bolívar in the Liga de Fútbol Profesional Boliviano next year. In 2011, he had a brief spell with Paraguayan club Guaraní before moving to Chile to play for Audax Italiano. He moved to Millonarios FC in the Colombian Primera A in January 2012. The following year he was repatriated by club Rentistas. In 2014 Ithuarralde had a short spell with Bolivian side Blooming before returning to Rentistas later that year.

Ithurralde subsequently represented Racing Montevideo and Deportivo Maldonado before retiring with Cerro in 2017.

International
After representing Uruguay at under-17 and under-20 levels, Ithurralde made his debut with the full side on 27 September 2006, in a 1–0 friendly loss against Venezuela.

Managerial career
In 2020, Ithurralde returned to his first club Defensor as a manager of the youth sides. On 23 June 2021, he replaced Juan Tejera at the helm of Boston River in the top tier.

Ithurralde qualified Boston River to the 2023 Copa Libertadores, the club's first-ever participation in the tournament, but still left on 4 November 2022.

References

External links

1983 births
Living people
Uruguayan footballers
Uruguay international footballers
Uruguayan people of Basque descent
Defensor Sporting players
Association football defenders
Rosario Central footballers
C.F. Monterrey players
Olimpo footballers
Peñarol players
Club Bolívar players
Audax Italiano footballers
Club Guaraní players
Millonarios F.C. players
C.A. Rentistas players
Club Blooming players
Racing Club de Montevideo players
Deportivo Maldonado players
C.A. Cerro players
Uruguayan Primera División players
Chilean Primera División players
Argentine Primera División players
Liga MX players
Categoría Primera A players
Bolivian Primera División players
Expatriate footballers in Chile
Expatriate footballers in Argentina
Expatriate footballers in Paraguay
Expatriate footballers in Bolivia
Expatriate footballers in Mexico
Expatriate footballers in Colombia
Uruguayan football managers
Uruguayan Primera División managers
Boston River managers
Montevideo City Torque managers